The Wisconsin State Open is the Wisconsin state open golf tournament, open to both amateur and professional golfers. It is organized by the Wisconsin section of the PGA of America. It has been played annually since 1919 at courses in the state. It was considered a PGA Tour event in the mid-1930s.

Winners
Source: 

1919 Arthur Clarkson
1920 Arthur Clarkson
1921 Jimmy Mason
1922 W.R. Lovekin
1923 Neil McIntyre
1924 Jack Blakeslee
1925 Jack Blakeslee
1926 Adolph Bock (a)
1927 Francis Gallett
1928 Frank Walsh
1929 John Bird
1930 Johnny Revolta
1931 Johnny Revolta
1932 Francis Gallett
1933 Francis Gallett
1934 Johnny Revolta
1935 Johnny Revolta
1936 Butch Krueger
1937 Jim Milward (a)
1938 Jim Milward
1939 Francis Gallett
1940 Butch Krueger
1941 Hank Gardner
1942 Francis Gallett
1943–1944 No tournament
1945 Floyd Leonard
1946 Jim Milward
1947 Jim Milward
1948 Tom Veech (a)
1949 Butch Krueger
1950 George Kinsman, Jr.
1951 Billy Milward (a)
1952 Manuel de la Torre
1953 Manuel de la Torre
1954 Walter Porterfield
1955 Manuel de la Torre
1956 Tom Veech
1957 Tom Veech
1958 Bob Brue (a)
1959 Bob Brue (a)
1960 Tom Puls
1961 Manuel de la Torre
1962 Tommy Veech
1963 Bob Brue
1964 Steve Bull
1965 Eddie Davis
1966 Eddie Davis
1967 Steve Bull
1968 Manuel de la Torre
1969 John Toepel, Jr.
1970 Bob Brue
1971 Ralph Schlicht
1972 Bob Brue
1973 Rolf Deming
1974 Mark Bemowski (a)
1975 Rick Rasmussen (a)
1976 Dennis Tiziani
1977 Rolf Deming
1978 Larry Tiziani
1979 Walter Porterfield
1980 Roy Abrameit
1981 Bill Kokott
1982 Allen Christ (a)
1983 Mike Muranyi
1984 Greg Dick
1985 Eddie Terasa
1986 Bill Brodell
1987 Steve Stricker (a)
1988 Skip Kendall
1989 Skip Kendall
1990 Steve Stricker
1991 Steve Stricker
1992 Jerry Kelly
1993 Dave Miley
1994 Ben Walter
1995 Eddie Terasa
1996 Jim Schuman
1997 Ben Walter
1998 Steve Stricker
1999 Jim Schuman
2000 Steve Stricker
2001 Mark Wilson
2002 Mario Tiziani
2003 Jon Turcott (a)
2004 David Roesch
2005 Ben Walter
2006 Jon Turcott
2007 Dan Woltman (a)
2008 Ryan Helminen
2009 Dan Woltman (a)
2010 Eddie Terasa
2011 Jordan Niebrugge (a)
2012 Andrew Steinhofer
2013 Jim Lemon
2014 Ryan Helminen
2015 Kyle Henning
2016 Jordan Elsen
2017 Maxwell Hosking
2018 Dan Woltman
2019 Dan Woltman
2020 Harrison Ott (a)
2021 Harrison Ott (a)
2022 Daniel Mazziotta

(a) denotes amateur

References

External links
PGA of America – Wisconsin section

Former PGA Tour events
Golf in Wisconsin
PGA of America sectional tournaments
State Open golf tournaments
Recurring sporting events established in 1919
1919 establishments in Wisconsin